Ronnie Slevin (born 1941 in Aglish, County Tipperary) is a retired Irish sportsperson.  He played hurling with his local club Borrisokane and was a member of the Tipperary senior inter-county team for one season in 1962. Slevin won a set of All-Ireland and Munster titles with Tipp in 1962.

References

1941 births
Living people
Borrisokane hurlers
Tipperary inter-county hurlers